Peace forest is a forest in South - Southeast Jerusalem, Israel, between the Abu Tor neighbourhood and the Sherover Promenade.

The Peace Forest was planted on a site identified with the biblical Azal river mentioned in the book of Zechariah (Zechariah 14:5). There are a number of graves of the Second Temple era found in the Peace Forest, some of which have Hebrew inscriptions on them. In 1990, a grave with an Aramaic inscription "Joseph, son of Caiaphas" was found in the Peace Forest, which probably belongs to the High priest Caiaphas (see Caiaphas ossuary).
The Peace Forest also contains remains of an aqueduct which supplied Jerusalem with water at a time of the Second Temple.

See also
List of forests in Israel
Tourism in Israel

References

 Harley Stark, "Jerusalem, Ya‘ar Ha-Shalom Final Report", Excavations and Surveys in Israel, Journal 118

Forests of Israel
Parks in Jerusalem